The 1998 Atlanta Falcons season was the franchise's 33rd in the National Football League (NFL). The Falcons qualified for the Super Bowl for the first time under the guidance of head coach Dan Reeves in his second year with the team, becoming the first dome team to play in a Super Bowl. The Falcons won their final nine regular season games to earn the #2 seed in the National Football Conference (NFC) for the postseason and the first-week bye. They and the Broncos both had 14–2 records, but the Falcons were the second best in the league because they had a better record against common opponents. They beat the San Francisco 49ers in the Divisional round and the #1-seed Minnesota Vikings in the NFC Championship Game before losing to Reeves’ old team, the Denver Broncos, 34–19 in Super Bowl XXXIII. They were a perfect 8–0 at home.

Head coach Dan Reeves almost didn't make it to the end of the season. After Week 15, he was diagnosed with multiple blockages to his coronary arteries, necessitating quadruple bypass surgery. Reeves admitted he ignored the warning signs in hopes of finishing the season, but ultimately felt he needed to be checked out. Doctors stated by the time he went for treatment, he may have been “within hours of a catastrophic heart attack.” Defensive coordinator Rich Brooks substituted for him as head coach during Weeks 16 and 17. Reeves returned for the playoffs and finished the season.

The Falcons ranked fourth in the league in points scored (442 points) and surrendered the fourth-fewest points (289) in 1998; the Falcons also led the league in turnover differential at +20. The Falcons set a still-standing team record for point differential, with +153. Four of the Falcons' wins were by at least 22 points.

Offseason

NFL draft

Personnel

Staff

Roster

Regular season

Schedule
This was the first occasion when the Falcons played the New York Giants since 1988, and their first visit to Giants Stadium since 1982. This is due to old NFL scheduling formulas in place prior to 2002, whereby teams had no rotating schedule opposing members of other divisions within their own conference, but instead played interdivisional conference games according to position within a season's table.

Standings

Notable games
October 4 vs. Carolina Panthers:

The Falcons' most decisive win of the season came in a 51–23 rout in the Georgia Dome. Jamal Anderson rushed for 117 yards and a touchdown while Chris Chandler threw for 189 yards and two touchdowns with two picks. From Tim Dwight’s 93-yard opening kickoff return touchdown, the Falcons never let Carolina have a sniff of contention, leading 38–3 by the third quarter before cruising home with the win.

November 8 at New England Patriots:

Atlanta’s offense rolled up 41 points while the defense limited New England to just ten points at Foxboro Stadium in a game where New England never got closer than a 14–3 score after one quarter and trailed 28–3 at the half. Jamal Anderson ran in two scores, Chris Chandler threw two more, and Chuck Smith grabbed a fumble at his 29 and ran it back for a touchdown. Chandler completed 15 of 22 throws for 240 yards and Anderson rushed for 104 yards. About the only thing that went wrong for the Falcons were two meaningless picks by the Patriots' Ty Law.

November 15 vs. San Francisco 49ers:

The Falcons avenged one of the only two losses they would suffer in the regular season by besting the Niners 31–19 in the Georgia Dome. Steve Young threw for 342 yards and touchdowns to Terrell Owens and Jerry Rice, but Jamal Anderson’s 100-rushing yards and two scores helped the Falcons put away the Niners in a wild fourth quarter in which the two teams combined for 34 points (21 by the Falcons).

Postseason

NFC Divisional Playoff: vs. San Francisco 49ers

The rubber match of Atlanta and San Francisco's 1998 season came in the Georgia Dome a week after the Niners' spectacular last-minute comeback over the Green Bay Packers. The Falcons, though, would not be denied as Jamal Anderson once again hauled the mail with 113 rushing yards and two touchdowns. Steve Young threw a touchdown to Jerry Rice and ran in a late fourth-quarter score; Ty Detmer threw the ensuing two-point conversion to Greg Clark to put the score at 20–18, but the Falcons never let the Niners any closer for their first playoff win since 1991.

NFC Championship: at Minnesota Vikings

The 16–1 Vikings, boasting the league's highest-scoring post-merger offense, were heavy favorites at Hubert H. Humphrey Metrodome and raced to a 20–7 lead in the second quarter off two Randall Cunningham touchdowns (one rushing and a throw to Randy Moss), but at the end of the first half Chris Chandler found Terance Mathis for a 14-yard score following a Cunningham fumble (forced by Chuck Smith near the end of the half). After a Morten Andersen field goal made it 20–17 in the third, the Vikings surged to a 27–17 lead on another Cunningham TD throw (this one to Matthew Hatchette). In the frantic final ten minutes of regulation, the Falcons, trailing 27-20, appeared poised to tie the game after Shane Dronett recovered a botched snap deep in Vikings territory, but they turned the ball over on downs after foregoing a field goal on fourth-and-four, when a Chandler pass to Mathis fell incomplete. In the final four minutes, Gary Anderson, who hadn't missed a field goal all season, sent a 38-yarder narrowly wide left. With just over two minutes remaining, Chandler then drove the Falcons downfield and connected with Mathis in the endzone with 49 seconds remaining. Both teams punted in overtime (the Vikings, who had the ball first and had nearly won when Eugene Robinson dove to defend a deep pass to an otherwise uncovered Moss). On their second drive of the extra period, Chandler connected with OJ Santiago for two big gains before Andersen nailed a 38-yard field goal; the 30–27 final sent the Falcons to Super Bowl XXXIII.

Super Bowl XXXIII

References

External links
 1998 Atlanta Falcons at Pro-Football-Reference.com

Atlanta Falcons seasons
Atlanta
NFC West championship seasons
National Football Conference championship seasons
Atlanta Falcons